Ashton Galpin (born 13 May 1950) is a South African cricketer. He played in nineteen first-class and seven List A matches for Eastern Province from 1971/72 to 1978/79.

See also
 List of Eastern Province representative cricketers

References

External links
 

1950 births
Living people
South African cricketers
Eastern Province cricketers
Cricketers from Port Elizabeth